Ross Alexander (born Alexander Ross Smith; July 27, 1907 – January 2, 1937) was an American stage and film actor.

Early years 
Alexander was born Alexander Ross Smith in Brooklyn, New York, the son of Maud Adelle ( Cohen) and Alexander Ross Smith. His maternal great-grandfather Morris Cohen was a Polish Jewish immigrant. His father was a leather merchant.

Ross Alexander was born and raised in Brooklyn until his high school years. He attended Erasmus Hall High School in Brooklyn for a while until he and his family moved to upstate Rochester, New York. He attended high school there, but he dropped out before graduating. 

When he was 17, he went to New York City and studied acting at the Packard Theatrical Agency.

Stage 
Alexander began his acting career with the Henry Jewett Players in Boston, debuting in Enter Madame. By 1926, he was regarded as a promising leading man with good looks and an easy and charming style and began appearing in more substantial roles.

His Broadway credits include The Party's Over (1932), Honeymoon (1932), The Stork Is Dead (1932), After Tomorrow (1931), That's Gratitude (1930), Let Us Be Gay (1928), The Ladder (1926), and Enter Madame (1920).

Film 

Alexander was signed to a film contract by Paramount Pictures, and his film debut in The Wiser Sex (1932) was not a success, and so he returned to Broadway. In 1934, he was signed to another studio contract, this time by Warner Bros. His bigger successes from this period were Flirtation Walk (1934), A Midsummer Night's Dream and Captain Blood (both 1935).

In 1936, he starred in Hot Money. It was a defining role in his persona as a glamorous, well-dressed and dapper leading man, not in the usual Warner gangster mold of rough-hewn stars such as Edward G. Robinson or Paul Muni.

His final film Ready, Willing and Able, a Ruby Keeler musical, was released posthumously. Supposedly Ronald Reagan was signed by the studio as a replacement for Alexander due to remarked similarities in their radio voices and mannerisms.

Personal life 
Alexander married actress Aleta Freel on February 28, 1934, in East Orange, New Jersey. Freel committed suicide on December 7, 1935, shooting herself in the head with a .22 rifle. On September 17, 1936, Alexander married actress Anne Nagel, with whom he had appeared in the films China Clipper and Here Comes Carter (both 1936).

Death
On January 2, 1937, three months after marrying Nagel, with his professional and personal life in disarray and deeply in debt, Alexander shot himself in the head in the barn behind his home. Although it has been reported that Alexander used the same gun with which his first wife Aleta Freel killed herself, he actually shot himself with a .22 pistol (not a rifle). He is buried in lot 292 of the Sunrise Slope section of Forest Lawn Cemetery in Glendale, California.

Filmography

References

External links 
 
 
 
 

1907 births
1937 suicides
20th-century American male actors
American male film actors
American male stage actors
American people of Polish-Jewish descent
Burials at Forest Lawn Memorial Park (Glendale)
Male actors from Los Angeles
Male actors from New York City
Suicides by firearm in California
People from Brooklyn
Paramount Pictures contract players
1937 deaths
Jewish American male actors
Erasmus Hall High School alumni